Peter Grace Sseruwagi (30 December 1933 – 6 February 2018) was a Ugandan boxer and coach for the national team. He competed in the men's light welterweight event at the 1960 Summer Olympics. At the 1960 Summer Olympics, he lost to Khalid Al-Karkhi of Iraq.

References

External links
 

1933 births
2018 deaths
Ugandan male boxers
Olympic boxers of Uganda
Boxers at the 1960 Summer Olympics
Light-welterweight boxers